Britton Lee Inc. was a pioneering relational database company. Renamed ShareBase, it was acquired by Teradata in June, 1990.

History
Britton Lee was founded in 1979 by David L. Britton, Geoffrey M. Lee and a group of hardware engineers along with Robert Epstein, Michael Ubell and Paula Hawthorn from the research team that created Ingres.

Epstein later left Britton Lee to help found Sybase. Britton and Lee left the company in 1987.

On May 15, 1989, the company formally changed its name to ShareBase Corporation.

After layoffs and financial losses in 1989, ShareBase was acquired by Teradata in June, 1990.

Products
As of Fall, 1989:
 ShareBase II (tm): An RDBMS designed for a client/server environment.
 ShareBase(tm) I: Predecessor to ShareBase II
 ShareBase SQL Database Server, various models:
 Server/8000(tm): "Upper-mid-range database server" that supported ShareBase II. Optimized database operations on a RISC/ECL database processor. Used a "distributed function multiprocessor architecture" and included up to 256 megabytes of "shared high-speed data memory." Supported a variety of clients, including IBM PC DOS, Apple Macintosh, Sun, AT&T 3B series computers systems, Pyramid, DEC VAX, HP 3000 and HP 9000, and IBM VM/CMS and MVS.
 Server/300 (tm), supported ShareBase I and worked with a variety of clients, including PC/DOS, UNIX workstations, AT&T System V, Sun, and DEC VAX with BSD/UNIX, VAX/VMS, or ULTRIX. It also supported up to 50 databases, 32,000 tables per database, 2 billion rows per table, 4 megabytes of memory, and 200 concurrent users.
 Server/700 (tm), supported ShareBase I, same basic features as the Server/300 but with 6 megabytes of memory and "greater performance for more demanding environments".
 ShareCom: Communications facilities between database clients and the ShareBase servers.

The Server/300 came in three models:
 model 25, 600 megabytes of disk storage and one tape drive
 model 35, 1200 megabytes of disk storage and two tape drives
 model 60, 3320 megabytes of disk storage and two tape drives

Affiliation with Omnibase/SmartStar
An announcement was made in 1984, that Britton-Lee's Intelligent Database Machine (IDM) was being sold together with Signal Technology Inc.'s Omnibase and SmartStar relational database software.

This hardware/software combination of Omnibase/Smartstar/Britton Lee Data Base Machine(s), was used by NASA, USMC and by financial services for analysis.

SmartStar is Signal Technology Inc (STI)'s application development environment 
for the VAX, and it supports several databases using native connections:
 RMS, Rdb/VMS,  Oracle, Sybase, Ingres, Teradata/ShareBase.

Although before SQL became standard STI's focus was on IQL (Interactive Query Language), now the query language it supports is SQL.

Components include
 SmartBuilder
 SmartDesign
 SmartStation
 SmartGL
 SmartCall and RSQL (for use from 3GL languages)
 SmartQuery
 SmartMove (mass load/unload)
 SmartReport
 SmartPainter 
 ISQL (Interactive SQL)

Signal Technology Inc
As the above combination moved along, STI and Britton-Lee saw a validation in the form of a review, which confirmed: "there exists no database management system that matches the performance of the IDM with OMNIBASE."

References

External links
  SmartStar Official web site

Software companies based in California
Companies based in Silicon Valley
Teradata
Defunct software companies of the United States